In Islam, a mahram is a family member with whom marriage would be considered permanently unlawful (haram). One's spouse is also a mahram. A woman does not need to wear hijab around her mahram, and an adult male mahram may escort a woman on a journey, although an escort may not be obligatory.

Overview

People with whom marriage is prohibited
 permanent or blood mahrams include:
 all direct ancestors
 all direct descendants
 siblings
 siblings of parents, grandparents and further antecedents
 children and further descendants of siblings
 in-law mahrams with whom one becomes mahram by marrying someone:
 all the ancestors of one's spouse
 all the descendants of one's spouse
 all who marry a direct ancestor
 all who marry a direct descendant

(Note: A woman may marry her stepfather only if the stepfather has not consummated his marriage to her mother.) 
 Rada or "milk-suckling mahrams" with whom one becomes mahram because of being nursed by the same woman:
 foster mother 
 foster sibling
When a woman acts as a wetnurse (that is she breast feeds an infant that is not her own child for a certain amount of time under certain conditions), she becomes the child's rada mother. In English these can be referred to as milk brother, milk-mother, and so on. For a man, mahram women include his mother, grandmother, daughter, granddaughter, sister, aunt, grandaunt, niece, grandniece, his father's wife, his wife's daughter (step-daughter), his daughter-in-law (if previously married to his biological son. She's not mahram if she was married to his adopted son), his mother-in-law, his rada mother and rada sister. As the Prophet Mohamed said, "What is forbidden by reason of kinship is forbidden by reason of suckling."

These are considered mahram because they are mentioned in the Quran (An-Nisa 22–23):

All of the man's female relatives mentioned in these two verses are considered his maharim, because it is unlawful (haram) for him to marry them, except the wife's sister, whom he can marry if he divorces her sister, or if his wife dies. The notion of mahram is reciprocal. All other relatives are considered non-maharim.

Legal escorts of women during journey

A woman may be legally escorted during a journey by her husband, or by any sane, adult male mahram by blood, although an escort may not be required, including:
her father, grandfather or other male ancestor
her son, grandson or other male descendant
her brother
her uncle, great uncle, or uncle from a previous generation
the son, grandson, or other descendant of her sibling

Rules

Mahram
A Muslim woman's mahrams form the group of allowable escorts when she travels.

For a spouse, being mahram is a permanent condition. That means, for example, that a man will remain mahram to his ex-mother-in-law after divorcing her daughter.

See also
 Baligh
 Cousin marriage
 Dayyuth
 Hijab
Ḥ-R-M
 Islamic sexual jurisprudence
 Islamic marital jurisprudence
 Chaperone (social) - an adult female escort for unmarried girls in Western European tradition, dueña  in Spanish (anglicised duenna).

References

Abdul-Rahman, Muhammad Saed, Islam: Questions and Answers - Jurisprudence and Islamic Rulings, London: MSA Publication Limited, 2007, pp. 22–23.
Packard, Gwen K., Coping in an Interfaith Family, New York: Rosen Publishing Group, 1993, p. 11.

Arabic words and phrases in Sharia
Human population genetics
Marriage in Islam
Kinship and descent
Modesty in Islam
Sex segregation and Islam
Islamic terminology